"Crazy Things I Do" was released as the final single from American R&B teen-singer's Sammie' debut album From the Bottom to the Top. The song only achieved minor to moderate success, with peak positions of 39 on the Hot R&B/Hip-Hop Songs chart and 19 on the Rhythmic Top 40 chart.

The music video was released and received primarily limited airplay on BET throughout 2000.

Chart positions

References 

2000 singles
Sammie songs
Songs written by Tricky Stewart
Songs written by Traci Hale
Song recordings produced by Tricky Stewart
2000 songs
Capitol Records singles